"(And The) Pictures in the Sky" is a song by the British band, Medicine Head.  It was written by band member, John Fiddler.

The first hit single for Medicine Head, it was released in 1971 and entered the UK Singles Chart in June, reaching number 22 in July.

References

1971 singles
Medicine Head songs
Dandelion Records singles
1971 songs